Asterix and the Secret Weapon is the twenty-ninth volume of the Asterix comic book series and the fifth by Albert Uderzo alone. It parodies feminism, gender equality/relationships, and military secrets.

Plot summary
The story begins when a female bard named Bravura is being hired by the women of the village, who think that Cacofonix is giving their children a poor education. Upon hearing this, Cacofonix secludes himself in the forest nearby. When Bravura arrives, the women are stunned by her singing and the men laugh at it; much to her annoyance. Over the next few days, Bravura exhorts Impedimenta (and later other village women) to resist the authority of her husband. Impedimenta then quarrels with Vitalstatistix, who joins Cacofonix in the forest. Impedimenta is then made chief by the women, while the men do not dare vote against their wives.

Meanwhile, Julius Caesar, to take over the village, sends his agent Manlius Claphamomnibus, with orders to bring the "secret weapon" over the ocean discreetly. At the village, Bravura's reforms spread discord among all the locals. Asterix, troubled by all of this from the start, is approached by Bravura, who offers to marry him and assume joint chieftainship; whereupon Asterix accuses her of coming to the village to seize power. When she kisses him, Asterix hits her reflexively, but feels shame and regret immediately after. For striking a woman, Impedimenta expels Asterix from the village; when Getafix objects to this, Bravura insults him. Immediately, Getafix and the other village men join Vitalstatistix in the forest.

Claphamomnibus's ship lands at Gaul, and he reveals the secret weapon: female legionaries, whom the Gaulish men would refuse to fight for fear of being dishonored. Asterix, when he learns of this, is sent to warn the village women of the threat. Bravura suggests making peace, and goes to meet the female legionaries herself. However, she is refused, and Claphamomnibus insults her. At this, Asterix approaches Bravura with a plan. His initial step is to have Cacofonix sing onomatopoeia in the forest, causing rain and scaring all animals (in one scene exposing a dragon), which in turn terrifies the female Roman scout parties and delays their assault. When the Roman women eventually attack the village, they find that Bravura has converted the village into a shopping mall where the women can buy clothes and get their hair and makeup done. In the meantime, the men of the village defeat the male soldiers stationed around the village; and finally, Cacofonix sings again to expel the women. Julius Caesar is made the laughing stock of Rome, and Bravura leaves for Lutetia, reconciled with Asterix.

Notes

 The original French title is La Rose et le Glaive (The Rose and the Sword). The word glaive in French is used to designate both a Roman gladius and a long spear with a shaped blade on the end, though the cover design shows a sword. The French title may refer to 1953 film "The Sword and the Rose", and possibly also Paul Verhoeven's gruesome medieval film "Flesh & Blood" (1985) which is also known as "The Rose and the Sword".
The name of the Roman official, Manlius Claphamomnibus, is a pun on the English expression "the man on the Clapham omnibus"—a legal term for a reasonably educated and intelligent but non-specialist person, an everyday person against whom a defendant's conduct might be judged in a court of law.
Cacofonix at last gets to beat up Fulliautomatix (instead of vice versa), and for the second time since Asterix and the Magic Carpet the Bard is seen inflicting violence.
 It borrows plot elements and visual gags from a large number of previous albums, including:
Sending Obelix back to school from Asterix and the Class Act
Bard sweeping old musical notes out of the tree house (which fall on passersby below) from Asterix and the Goths
Using female legionaries to defeat the chivalrous Gauls from Asterix as you've never seen him
Animals fleeing the bard's song we see the same scene as in Asterix and the Normans including a turtle running on its hind legs
Cacofonix's singing causes rain as in Asterix and the Magic Carpet.
The village children (with conflict between Unhygenix' and Fulliautomatix') from Asterix in Corsica
An outsider causing an election to replace the chief from Asterix and Caesar's Gift
This is the second album in which Asterix is exiled, the first being Asterix and the Cauldron.
In Dutch the title "The Secret Weapon" would translate to "Het Geheime Wapen" which is actually the Dutch title for Asterix and the Falling Sky
When Cacofonix leaves the village, he quotes one of Nero's famous last words, "Qualis artifex pereo" ("What an artist dies with me"). This precedes Nero's citation before his suicide by 118 years.

In other languages
Ancient Greek: Μεταξύ ρόδου και ξίφους
Catalan: La rosa i l'espasa
Cretan Greek: Σπαθί και τριαντάφυλλο
Croatian: Ruža i mač
Czech: Růže a meč
Danish: Rosen og Svaerdet
Dutch: De roos en het zwaard
Finnish: Ruusu ja Miekka (also translated into the Karelian dialect under the name Kallija tyttölöi (roughly translatable as Girls of Gaul))
French: La Rose et le Glaive
German: Asterix und Maestria
Greek: Ρόδο και ξίφος
Italian: La Rosa e il Gladio
Indonesian: "Mawar dan Pedang Bermata Dua"
Norwegian: Damenes Inntogsmarsj, translates "The Women Marching In"
Portuguese: A Rosa e o Gládio
Polish: Róża i miecz
Pontic Greek: Σπαθιά και τριαντάφυλλα
Serbian: Ружа и мач/Ruža i mač
Spanish: Astérix, la rosa y la espada
Swedish: Rosen och svärdet

Reception 
On Goodreads, it has a score of 3.69 out of 5.

External links 
Official Website

References

Secret Weapon, Asterix and the
1991 graphic novels
Comics by Albert Uderzo
Depictions of Julius Caesar in comics
Works about feminism